My Patricia (Patricia mía, also known as Punto y banca )  is a 1961 romantic comedy film directed by Enrique Carreras, with a screenplay by Emilio Villalba Welsh based on an idea by Enrique Carreras. It stars Carlos Estrada and Susana Canales and features the musical group Los Cinco Latinos. It was partially filmed in Mar del Plata and is the posthumous film of Francisco Álvarez who died in April 1960.

Plot
A woman waiting for her gambler husband is courted by a film actor.

Cast
  Carlos Estrada
  Susana Canales
  Julio Peña
  José Isbert
  Ricardo Castro Ríos
  Nelly Cobella
  Enrique San Miguel
  Francisco Álvarez
  Pablo Acciaresi
  Los Cinco Latinos

Reception
La Razón said in its chronicle:  "A deficient cha-cha-cha... Estrada, in his role as an established actor, whispers "The film is very bad". It sounds like a confession." Clarín opined: "Absurd dialogue and forced situations."  Raúl Manrupe and María Alejandra Portela in their book Un diccionario de films argentinos (1930–1995) write (translated from Spanish): " La dolce vita according to Carreras, in one of his worst films".

References

External links
 

1961 films
1960s Spanish-language films
Argentine black-and-white films
1960s Argentine films
1961 romantic comedy films
1960s Spanish films
Argentine romantic comedy films
Spanish romantic comedy films
Films directed by Enrique Carreras